The William McKinley Memorial, is a statue honoring the assassinated United States President William McKinley which stands at the foot of the Panhandle Park, San Francisco, California, facing the DMV across Baker Street. Created by Robert Ingersoll Aitken (1878–1949) in 1904, the Monument was dedicated in 1903 by President Theodore Roosevelt, who succeeded McKinley after his assassination in 1901. The monument was unveiled on November 24, 1904 at the entrance to the Golden Gate Park panhandle. Over 5,000 people came to the unveiling. Speeches were made by former Mayor James D. Phelan, Mayor Eugene Schmitz, John McNaught, and others.

History

On May 13, 1903, President Theodore Roosevelt visited San Francisco to break ground at the Golden Gate Park for the erection of a monument to the late President William McKinley. Five thousand people came to the Golden Gate Park to see the president take a golden spade and dig into the ground and bring up a spadeful of earth. He was greeted by former Mayor James D. Phelan, who was president of the McKinley Memorial Fund. The monument was erected at a cost of $40,000.

Robert Ingersoll Aitken, of San Francisco, was hired to sculpt a  statue of a female figure, representing the  Republic, that stands dressed in a tunic and cape with a laurel wreath around her head. She holds a palm leaf in her raised right hand while her left hand grasps the shaft of a sword. The statue is placed on a base that is decorated with a bust of William McKinley shown in profile. The statue and base are on a circular four-stepped platform. The inscription on front of the base, in incised with the letters: WILLIAM MCKINLEY. On the side of the base: GROUND FOR THIS MONUMENT WAS BROKEN BY PRES ROOSEVELT MAY 13, 1903. On other side of base: THIS MONUMENT WAS ERECTED BY THE PEOPLE OF SAN FRANCISCO A.D. 1904.

On November 24, 1904, the monument was unveiled, at the entrance to the Golden Gate Park panhandle, to the memory of William McKinley. Speeches were made by former Mayor James D. Phelan, Mayor Eugene Schmitz, John McNaught, and others. Over 5,000 people came to the unveiling. Robert I. Aitken was unable to attend as he was in Europe. The monument ranks among the best of his work.

During the 1906 San Francisco earthquake, refugees sought safety by setting up camp at the base of the McKinley monument at the entrance to Panhandle Park next to the Golden Gate Park.

Today, the McKinley monument has been the subject of graffiti artists for the past several years. The San Francisco Arts Commission has tried to stop this and is working with the North of Panhandle Neighborhood Association (NOPNA) and the Haight Ashbury Neighborhood Council (HANC) to come up with solutions. One plan was to put up a $65,00 fence to keep the taggers out.

See also
 Robert Ingersoll Aitken
 Panhandle (San Francisco)

References

External links
 Golden Gate Park Official website

Monuments and memorials in California
Burial monuments and structures
Stone monuments and memorials
1904 establishments in California
1904 sculptures
Landmarks in San Francisco
Outdoor sculptures in San Francisco
Sculptures of women in California
Statues in San Francisco